The 1980–81 Sheffield Shield season was the 79th season of the Sheffield Shield, the domestic first-class cricket competition in Australia. It started on 17 October 1980 and finished on 9 March 1981. Going into the final round of matches, New South Wales, Western Australia and Queensland were all in a position to win the Shield. It would be Western Australia, who found form in the second half of the season with four straight victories, who would emerge victorious, drawing against Queensland to secure its eighth championship.

Match summaries

Points table

Statistics

Most runs

Most wickets

References

External links
 1980–81 Sheffield Shield on ESPN Cricinfo

Sheffield Shield
Sheffield Shield
Sheffield Shield seasons